Thomas James Niland (April 14, 1870 – April 30, 1950), nicknamed "Honest John", was a professional baseball player.  He played for the St. Louis Browns of the National League in 1896.

References

1870 births
1950 deaths
Major League Baseball pitchers
Baseball players from Massachusetts
St. Louis Browns (NL) players
19th-century baseball players
Toledo White Stockings players
Toledo Swamp Angels players
Terre Haute Hottentots players
Grand Rapids Gold Bugs players
Detroit Tigers (Western League) players
New Britain Rangers players
Manchester Manchesters players